There are three species of lizard native to Africa named blue-headed tree agama:

 Acanthocercus atricollis
 Acanthocercus gregorii
 Acanthocercus minutus